Qarah Jalu (also Romanized as Qarah Jālū; also known as Qarah Jolū) is a village in Zangebar Rural District, in the Central District of Poldasht County, West Azerbaijan Province, Iran. At the 2006 census, its population was 468, in 89 families.

References 

Populated places in Poldasht County